Ernst Brun Jr. (born December 4, 1990) is an American football tight end who is a free agent. He previously played for the Washington Redskins. He previously played in college at Iowa State as well as the 2015 United States National American Football Team in the 2015 IFAF World Championship.

College career
In his junior year at Iowa State he made 26 receptions for 330 yards and six touchdowns. However his senior year was marked with numerous injuries. He only recorded six catches and 47 yards over eight games. He suffered from a rare form of muscle cramping causing raised creatine phosphokinase levels which dampened his chances in the 2014 NFL Draft. Overall, he recorded 32 catches for 377 yards and 6 touchdowns.

2015 IFAF World Championship
During the 2015 IFAF World Championship in Canton Ohio he was part of the United States team led by Dan Hawkins that won a gold medal in the tournament.

NFL career
The Washington Redskins signed him on August 15, 2015. This came on the back of Niles Paul and Logan Paulson being placed on the Injured Reserve list. He was waived on August 31, 2015.

References

1990 births
Living people
Washington Redskins players
Players of American football from Georgia (U.S. state)
People from Stone Mountain, Georgia
Sportspeople from DeKalb County, Georgia
Iowa State Cyclones football players